The Gov. Thomas Kirker Homestead, in Liberty Township, Adams County, Ohio near West Union, Ohio, was built in 1805.  It was listed on the National Register of Historic Places in 1975.

It is located southwest of West Union off State Route 136.

The original 1805-built portion of the house is a stone, three-bay by two-bay, one-and-a-half-story structure.

It was home of Thomas Kirker, an immigrant from Ireland who became Ohio's second governor during 1807–08.<ref name

The homestead was visited by Confederate soldiers raiding for horses, under John Hunt Morgan, but their quest was unsuccessful as the place had been warned of their approach.

See also
Kirker Covered Bridge, also NRHP-listed

References

Sobel, Robert, and John Raimo, eds. Biographical Directory of the Governors of the United States, 1789-1978, Vol. 3, Westport, Conn.; Meckler Books, 1978. 4 vols.

National Register of Historic Places in Adams County, Ohio
Residential buildings completed in 1805